Nestlé is a Swiss company.

Nestle may also refer to:

People
 Eberhard Nestle (1851–1913), German biblical scholar, father of Erwin Nestle
 Erwin Nestle (1883–1972), German biblical scholar, son of Eberhard Nestle
 Ingrid Nestle (born 1977), German politician
 Joan Nestle (born 1940), American writer, founder of the Lesbian Herstory Archives
 Henri Nestlé (1814–1890), born Heinrich Nestle, founder of the Nestlé company
 Marion Nestle (born 1936), American nutritional scientist

Other uses
 Nestlé Canada Building, Toronto, Ontario
 Nestlé Tower, Croydon, U.K.
 A German company founded by Karl Nessler, the inventor of the permanent wave
 "Nestle", a song by Far from the album Water & Solutions